Ivan Lendl was the defending champion but lost in the final 3–6, 7–6, 6–2, 6–0 to Boris Becker.

Seeds

  Ivan Lendl (final)
  Boris Becker (champion)
 n/a
  Paul McNamee (first round)
  Marcel Freeman (quarterfinals)
  Christo van Rensburg (first round)
  Mike Leach (second round)
  Wally Masur (quarterfinals)

Draw

Finals

Section 1

Section 2

External links
 1986 Swan Premium Open draw

Singles